"Yours" is a song by British singer and songwriter Ella Henderson. It was released 30 November 2014 via Syco Music as the third single off Henderson's debut studio album, Chapter One (2014). The song was co-written by Henderson and Josh Record. The single has gone on to sell in excess of 600,000 copies since its release, achieving a platinum accreditation from the British Phonographic Industry.

Track listing 
Digital download — Remixes EP
"Yours"  – 4:37
"Yours"  – 3:29
"Yours"  – 4:24
"Yours"  – 3:54

Music video 
The black-and-white video for "Yours" was directed by James Lees and premiered on 5 December 2014.

Charts

Certifications

Release history

References 

2010s ballads
2014 songs
2014 singles
Ella Henderson songs
Black-and-white music videos
Syco Music singles
Songs written by Josh Record
Songs written by Ella Henderson